Marie-Pascale Huglo (born March 20, 1961) is a French-born writer and educator living in Quebec.

Biography
She was born in Amiens. She studied modern literature and English studies at the University of Sorbonne Nouvelle Paris 3.  She moved to Montreal in 1983. She pursued studies in comparative literature at the Université de Montréal, receiving a doctorate in 1983. She teaches at the Université de Montréal, where she is a professor in the department of French language literature, and at the Université du Québec à Montréal.

Her essay Métamorphoses de l'insignifiant.

Selected works 
 La Fille d'Ulysse, novel (2015)
 Montréal-Mirabel, lignes de séparation, finalist for the

References 

1961 births
Living people
Université de Montréal alumni
Academic staff of the Université de Montréal
Canadian women novelists